is a Japanese international rugby union player who plays as a Fullback.

References

1995 births
Living people
Japanese rugby union players
Japan international rugby union players
Rugby union fullbacks
Tokai University alumni
Sunwolves players
Saitama Wild Knights players